The London Ecology Unit (LEU) provided advice to London boroughs on nature conservation issues between 1986 and 2000. It published a series of handbooks, some on specific conservation issues, and some which gave detailed descriptions of Sites of Importance for Nature Conservation (SINCs) in each borough. The handbooks provided a basis for addressing nature conservation in the boroughs' Unitary Development Plans, and for policy decisions in planning and leisure services.

History
In 1982 the Greater London Council (GLC) established an Ecology Team, which commissioned the London Wildlife Trust to undertake a survey of wildlife sites in London. The GLC was abolished in 1986, but the work of the Ecology Team was carried on by the LEU, working to a joint committee of London boroughs, the London Ecology Committee. In April 2000 the LEU was merged into the newly established Greater London Authority.

Publications
1. Ecology and Nature Conservation in London
2. A Guide to Habitat Creation
3. Nature Conservation Guidelines for London
4. Woodland, Wasteland, the Tidal Thames and Two London Boroughs
5. Nature Conservation in Brent (1st ed.)
7. Nature Conservation in Hillingdon
8. London's Meadows and Pastures
9. Nature Conservation in Croydon
10, Nature Conservation in Greenwich
11. Nature Conservation in Waltham Forest
12. Nature Conservation in Southwark
13. Nature Conservation in Harrow
14. Nature Areas for City People
15. Nature Conservation in Hounslow
16. Nature Conservation in Ealing
17. Nature Conservation in Newham
18. Nature Conservation in Kingston upon Thames
19. Nature Conservation in Islington
20. Nature Conservation in Barking and Dagenham
21. Nature Conservation in Richmond upon Thames
22. Nature Conservation in Sutton
23. Nature Conservation in Community Forest
24. Nature Conservation in Camden
25. Nature Conservation in Hammersmith & Fulham
26. Nature Conservation in Lambeth
27. Nature Conservation in Tower Hamlets
28. Nature Conservation in Barnet
29. Nature Conservation in Merton
30. Nature Conservation in Lewisham
31. Nature Conservation in Brent (2nd ed.)

Also: Building Green - A Guide to using plants on roofs, walls and pavements

References

Environmental organisations based in London
Conservation in London